Paraschiv is a Romanian surname. It may refer to:

Amansio Paraschiv (born 1992), Romanian kickboxer
Gabriel Paraschiv (born 1978), Romanian retired football player
Magdalena Paraschiv (born 1982), Romanian handball player
Sorin Paraschiv (born 1981), Romanian retired football player
Vasile Paraschiv (1928–2011), Romanian social and political activist

As a given name, it may refer to:

Paraschiv Vasilescu (1864–1925), Romanian general in World War I

Romanian-language surnames
Given names
Romanian masculine given names